The 2005–06 New Jersey Nets season was the team's 39th season in the NBA. Without Brian Scalabrine, who was signed as a free agent with the Boston Celtics in the offseason, they began the season hoping to improve upon their 42-40 output from the previous season. They bested it by seven wins, finishing 49-33 and qualifying for the playoffs for the fifth consecutive season. The Nets lost in the second round to the eventual champions, the  Miami Heat.

Roster

Regular season

Season standings

Record vs. opponents

Playoffs

|- align="center" bgcolor="#ffcccc"
| 1
| April 23
| Indiana
| L 88–90
| Vince Carter (31)
| Vince Carter (13)
| Jason Kidd (8)
| Continental Airlines Arena18,752
| 0–1
|- align="center" bgcolor="#ccffcc"
| 2
| April 25
| Indiana
| W 90–75
| Vince Carter (33)
| Jason Kidd (11)
| Jason Kidd (13)
| Continental Airlines Arena18,472
| 1–1
|- align="center" bgcolor="#ffcccc"
| 3
| April 27
| @ Indiana
| L 95–107
| Carter, Jefferson (25)
| Collins, Kidd (6)
| Richard Jefferson (7)
| Conseco Fieldhouse14,706
| 1–2
|- align="center" bgcolor="#ccffcc"
| 4
| April 29
| @ Indiana
| W 97–88
| Vince Carter (28)
| Nenad Krstić (8)
| Jason Kidd (8)
| Conseco Fieldhouse16,401
| 2–2
|- align="center" bgcolor="#ccffcc"
| 5
| May 2
| Indiana
| W 92–86
| Vince Carter (34)
| Vince Carter (15)
| Jason Kidd (15)
| Continental Airlines Arena18,804
| 3–2
|- align="center" bgcolor="#ccffcc"
| 6
| May 4
| @ Indiana
| W 96–90
| Richard Jefferson (30)
| Jason Kidd (12)
| Jason Kidd (11)
| Conseco Fieldhouse16,586
| 4–2
|-

|- align="center" bgcolor="#ccffcc"
| 1
| May 8
| @ Miami
| W 100–88
| Vince Carter (27)
| Jason Kidd (9)
| Jason Kidd (7)
| American Airlines Arena20,208
| 1–0
|- align="center" bgcolor="#ffcccc"
| 2
| May 10
| @ Miami
| L 89–111
| Vince Carter (22)
| Nenad Krstić (7)
| Jason Kidd (6)
| American Airlines Arena20,227
| 1–1
|- align="center" bgcolor="#ffcccc"
| 3
| May 12
| Miami
| L 92–103
| Vince Carter (43)
| Jason Collins (11)
| Jason Kidd (12)
| Continental Airlines Arena20,102
| 1–2
|- align="center" bgcolor="#ffcccc"
| 4
| May 14
| Miami
| L 92–102
| Vince Carter (26)
| Nenad Krstić (14)
| Jason Kidd (12)
| Continental Airlines Arena19,474
| 1–3
|- align="center" bgcolor="#ffcccc"
| 5
| May 16
| @ Miami
| L 105–106
| Carter, Jefferson (33)
| three players tied (7)
| Jason Kidd (8)
| American Airlines Arena20,255
| 1–4
|-

Player statistics

Regular season

|-
|Vince Carter
|79
|79
|36.8
|.430
|.341
|.799
|5.8
|4.3
|1.2
|0.7
|24.2
|-
|Richard Jefferson
|78
|78
|39.2
|.493
|.319
|.812
|6.8
|3.8
|0.8
|0.2
|19.5
|-
|Nenad Krstic
|80
|80
|30.9
|.507
|.250
|.698
|6.4
|1.1
|0.4
|0.8
|13.5
|-
|Jason Kidd
|80
|80
|37.2
|.404
|.352
|.795
|7.3
|8.4
|1.9
|0.4
|13.3
|-
|Clifford Robinson
|80
|13
|23.3
|.427
|.343
|.658
|3.3
|1.1
|0.6
|0.5
|6.9
|-
|Jeff McInnis
|28
|1
|17.4
|.441
|.188
|.690
|1.8
|1.9
|0.4
|0.1
|5.3
|-
|Marc Jackson
|37
|0
|11.7
|.446
|
|.792
|2.4
|0.6
|0.1
|0.2
|4.6
|-
|Jason Collins
|71
|70
|26.7
|.397
|.250
|.512
|4.8
|1.0
|0.6
|0.6
|3.6
|-
|Jacque Vaughn
|80
|6
|15.4
|.437
|.167
|.728
|1.1
|1.5
|0.5
|0.0
|3.4
|-
|Scott Padgett
|62
|1
|11.6
|.353
|.347
|.794
|2.7
|0.7
|0.5
|0.2
|3.4
|-
|Zoran Planinic
|56
|1
|10.6
|.361
|.232
|.697
|1.3
|0.9
|0.4
|0.1
|3.4
|-
|Lamond Murray
|57
|1
|10.1
|.398
|.346
|.625
|2.3
|0.2
|0.3
|0.1
|3.4
|-
|Bostjan Nachbar
|11
|0
|8.8
|.375
|.143
|.625
|1.0
|0.5
|0.3
|0.0
|2.8
|-
|Derrick Zimmerman
|2
|0
|16.0
|.667
|
|
|2.0
|3.5
|0.0
|0.0
|2.0
|-
|Antoine Wright
|39
|0
|9.5
|.358
|.067
|.500
|0.8
|0.3
|0.1
|0.1
|1.8
|-
|Linton Johnson
|9
|0
|3.9
|.500
|
|.250
|0.8
|0.2
|0.2
|0.0
|1.2
|-
|John Thomas
|2
|0
|18.0
|.167
|
|
|5.0
|0.0
|0.5
|0.5
|1.0
|}

Playoffs

|-
|Vince Carter
|11
|11
|40.9
|.463
|.241
|.796
|7.0
|5.3
|1.8
|0.5
|29.6
|-
|Richard Jefferson
|11
|11
|39.7
|.545
|.414
|.825
|4.1
|4.1
|0.9
|0.4
|22.2
|-
|Nenad Krstic
|11
|11
|33.3
|.504
|
|.711
|6.8
|0.7
|0.5
|0.9
|14.7
|-
|Jason Kidd
|11
|11
|40.9
|.371
|.300
|.826
|7.6
|9.6
|1.5
|0.2
|12.0
|-
|Lamond Murray
|11
|0
|17.9
|.389
|.353
|.818
|3.5
|0.2
|0.3
|0.0
|5.7
|-
|Clifford Robinson
|8
|0
|24.8
|.333
|.316
|.800
|3.3
|0.6
|1.1
|0.4
|4.5
|-
|Jason Collins
|11
|11
|27.5
|.360
|
|.591
|5.0
|0.3
|0.5
|0.2
|2.8
|-
|Jacque Vaughn
|11
|0
|14.5
|.364
|.000
|.571
|1.0
|1.1
|0.2
|0.0
|2.5
|-
|Scott Padgett
|3
|0
|3.0
|.500
|.000
|.500
|1.0
|0.0
|0.3
|0.0
|1.0
|-
|John Thomas
|8
|0
|7.0
|.500
|
|.500
|1.3
|0.3
|0.4
|0.1
|0.9
|-
|Antoine Wright
|5
|0
|2.0
|.250
|
|.667
|0.0
|0.0
|0.0
|0.0
|0.8
|-
|Zoran Planinic
|3
|0
|2.0
|.000
|
|.000
|0.3
|0.7
|0.3
|0.0
|0.0
|-
|Bostjan Nachbar
|1
|0
|1.0
|
|
|
|0.0
|0.0
|0.0
|0.0
|0.0
|}
Player Statistics Citation:

Transactions

Trades

Free agents

References

New Jersey Nets season
New Jersey Nets seasons
New Jersey Nets
New Jersey Nets
21st century in East Rutherford, New Jersey
Meadowlands Sports Complex